Sanaa McCoy Lathan (born September 19, 1971) is an American actress. She is the daughter of actress Eleanor McCoy and film director Stan Lathan. Her career began after she appeared in the shows In the House, Family Matters, NYPD Blue, and Moesha. Lathan later garnered further prominence after starring in the 1998 superhero film Blade; which followed with film roles in The Best Man (1999), Love & Basketball (2000), Disappearing Acts (2000), and Brown Sugar (2002).

In 2004, Lathan's performance in the Broadway revival of A Raisin in the Sun, earned her a nomination at the Tony Awards for Best Featured Actress in a Play. Following this, she played the role of Alexa "Lex" Woods in the movie Alien vs. Predator. In 2008, she landed a leading role in film The Family That Preys by Tyler Perry. Lathan returned to theatre work in 2010, starring in the all-black performance of Cat on a Hot Tin Roof at the Novello Theatre in London. She reprised her role as Robyn in the Christmas-themed sequel of The Best Man, in The Best Man Holiday (2013). In 2022,  she received a nomination for the Primetime Emmy Award for Outstanding Guest Actress in a Drama Series, for her work on the television series Succession.

As a voice actress, from (2009 to 2013), she voiced Donna Tubbs in The Cleveland Show and in all concurrent and subsequent Family Guy appearances, as well as Catwoman on Harley Quinn. Her other notable film credits include Out of Time (2003), Something New (2006), Wonderful World (2009), Contagion (2011), Repentance (2013), The Perfect Guy (2015), and Now You See Me 2 (2016). Lathan also made her directorial debut with the film On the Come Up in 2022.

Early life
Lathan was born in New York City. Her mother, Eleanor McCoy, was also an actress and dancer who performed on Broadway with Eartha Kitt. Her father, Stan Lathan, worked behind the scenes in television for PBS, as well as a producer on shows such as Sanford & Son and Russell Simmons' Def Comedy Jam. Her brother is Tendaji Lathan, a well known DJ. She attended Manhattan Center for Science and Mathematics as well as Beverly Hills High School.

Lathan's adolescence was a tough period. She has stated she was a latchkey kid whose parents weren't around much.  As a result, she was left with relatives who happened to suffer from drug abuse.  However, she went on to develop a solid relationship with her parents in the ensuing years.

She graduated from University of California, Berkeley, with a bachelor's degree in English. She then attended Yale University and earned a master's degree in drama.

Career
Following her training at Yale, where she studied with Earle R. Gister and performed in a number of Shakespeare plays, Lathan earned acclaim both off-Broadway and on the Los Angeles stage. Encouraged by her father to make Los Angeles her professional base, she found early television roles in episodes of such shows as In the House, Family Matters, NYPD Blue, and Moesha.

In 1998, Lathan earned a degree of recognition with her role as the mother of Wesley Snipes' title character in Blade. The following year she appeared in Life with Martin Lawrence and Eddie Murphy and did back-to-back turns in The Best Man and The Wood. The Best Man, a comedy-drama ensemble film starring Taye Diggs, Nia Long, Harold Perrineau Jr. and Morris Chestnut, was one of the top ten highest-grossing African American films in history, and Lathan received a NAACP Image Award nomination for her performance. The Wood, another ensemble film starring Diggs and Omar Epps, cast her as Epps' the love interest.

Lathan and Epps were reunited onscreen in Gina Prince-Bythewood's Love & Basketball, this time as a couple as passionate about basketball as they are about each other. Her performance earned Lathan the 2001 NAACP Image Award for Outstanding Actress in a Motion Picture, an Independent Spirit Award nomination for Best Actress, and a BET Award. In 2000, she appeared in the Off-Broadway production of The Vagina Monologues with Teri Garr and Julianna Margulies.

In 2001, Lathan earned acclaim for her work in the multicultural comedy film Catfish in Black Bean Sauce. Next was her second collaboration with Prince-Bythewood, Disappearing Acts, based on a novel by Terry McMillan. In the HBO film, she played an aspiring singer/songwriter in love with a carpenter, played by her Blade co-star Wesley Snipes. For her work in the film, she earned an Essence Award for Best Actress. That year, she was named by Ebony magazine as one of its 55 Most Beautiful People and was honoured by Essence magazine and Black Entertainment Television. In 2002, Lathan starred in the romantic comedy film, Brown Sugar with Diggs, Queen Latifah and Mos Def. Lathan's performance earned an NAACP Image Award Nomination for Outstanding Actress in a Motion Picture. The film also received an NAACP Image Award nomination for Outstanding Motion Picture. In 2003 she co-starred with Denzel Washington in Out of Time.

In 2004, Lathan starred on Broadway in A Raisin in the Sun with Sean Combs, Audra McDonald, and Phylicia Rashad, and received a Tony Award nomination for Best Performance by a Featured Actress for her portrayal of Beneatha Younger. She reprised the role in ABC Network's 2008 film adaptation.

The same year, she was given the lead role in Alien vs. Predator. It was a major success, grossing over $171 million worldwide. With this role she held onto a 15-year record for biggest opening weekend for a film starring a Black woman, debuting with $38.2 million. 

In 2006, she co-starred with Simon Baker in the romantic comedy Something New, and as Michelle Landau, the much younger wife of a Texas businessman (Larry Hagman) in the fourth season of the television series Nip/Tuck. She played Andrea in Tyler Perry's The Family That Preys, also starting Alfre Woodard and Kathy Bates, released in the U.S. on September 12, 2008.

In 2009, Lathan co-starred with Matthew Broderick in the drama Wonderful World. From 2009 to 2013, she voiced the character Donna Tubbs on The Cleveland Show. In 2011, Lathan co-starred in the Steven Soderbergh thriller Contagion with Matt Damon, Jude Law, Marion Cotillard, Kate Winslet, Gwyneth Paltrow, Bryan Cranston, and Laurence Fishburne. In 2011, she starred with Anthony Mackie and Forest Whitaker in Repentance, a psychological thriller directed by Phillipe Caland. She played series regular Mona Fredricks in the second season of Starz' original series Boss, starring Kelsey Grammer.

In 2013, Lathan reprised her role in The Best Man′s sequel, The Best Man Holiday. In 2016, she was cast in the ensemble of the sequel of Now You See Me, entitled Now You See Me 2, which was a box-office success; and in the sci-fi movie Approaching the Unknown. In 2017, she returned to TV in a lead role in the series Shots Fired, and also appeared in the movie American Assassin. She was then added to the main cast of The Affair, appearing in its fourth and fifth seasons, and starred in the Netflix film Nappily Ever After.

In January 2021, it was announced that she was cast in Season 3 of Succession as a Lisa Arthur, a high profile, well-connected New York lawyer earning her an Primetime Emmy Award for Outstanding Guest Actress in a Drama Series.

In 2021, she was announced as directing the film adaptation of Angie Thomas's novel On the Come Up. The film is slated to premiere at the 2022 Toronto International Film Festival.

Filmography

Film

Television

Video games

Music videos

Awards and nominations

References

External links

General
 
 
 
 Essence Interview (September 2008)
 MSNBC interview (February 2, 2006)
 MetroMix interview (February 2, 2006)
 BlackFilm interview (January 2006)
 Latino Review interview (August 2004)
 BlackFilm interview (August 2004)

1971 births
Living people
20th-century American actresses
21st-century American actresses
Actresses from New York City
African-American actresses
20th-century African-American women singers
American film actresses
American musical theatre actresses
American stage actresses
American television actresses
American voice actresses
People from New York City
Theatre World Award winners
University of California, Berkeley alumni
Yale University alumni
Yale School of Drama alumni
21st-century African-American women